Nir Alon (born 1964) is an Israeli sculptor and an installation artist based in Hamburg. 

Alon studied from 1988 until 1992 at the Bezalel Academy of Art and Design in Jerusalem. In 1996 he received the prize for young artists of the Israeli Ministry for education and Culture. In 1998 he participated in an exchange exhibition in Hamburg. In 2001 he received a working scholarship as a guest artist to Harburg. Since then he works and lives in Hamburg. He had solo exhibitions in Jerusalem, Tel Aviv, Schwerin, Bonn, Mannheim, Frankfurt and Hamburg. He preferably develops his sculptures from cast-off everyday life articles such as furniture, suit-cases, lamps, light bulbs and cables, whereby the installations are arranged directly at the place of exhibition and in the reference to these. Thus it obtains an urgent effect with most economical means. 

His works are in public and private collections in Germany, Israel, Italy and United States.

Selected exhibitions/installations
Cultural tracks-Trivial traps, Bezalel Academy, Jerusalem, 1993
Very delicate foundations, Kidmat-Eden-Gallery, Tel Aviv, 1994
Correct posture, Gross-Gallery, Tel Aviv, 1996
Game of suppositions and refutations, Nahshon Gallery, Nahshon, 1996
Sample of pervert imitation, Chelouche Gallery, Tel Aviv, 1997
Installation, Schleswig-Holstein-Haus, Schwerin, 2001
Operant Conditioning (Show), Kunstverein Harburger Bahnhof, Hamburg, 2002
A state of being present, Installation, Hamburg, 2003
Tell me about love, Installation, Kunsttreppe, Hamburg, 2004 
Ostentatiously stagger (guest), Atelierhaus Bonn, 2004
Ein Tag, ein Raum, ein Bild - Special show, Sebastian Fath Contemporary, Mannheim, 2004
Tell me about love (part II), Installation, Westwerk, Hamburg, 2004, (download catalogue 1.5 MB)
An installation kit for a wanderer artist (Guest), Hamburg, 2004
A funny game (Melancholy), Kampnagel Hamburg, 2005
In case of leftovers, Sebastian Fath Contemporary, Mannheim, 2005
This way or another – Kunstverein Buchholz.
Etwas Grosses wird geschehen, Appel Gallery, Frankfurt, 2006
Zeichnungen nach Installation, Magnus P. Gerdsen Gallery, Hamburg, 2006
Now You Have A Problem Mister, MARKING SPACE. HAMBURG. JERUSALEM., Galerie ChezLinda, Hamburg, 2007
active constellation, works from the collections of Reinking and Lafrenz – The House of Art, Brno, Czech Republic, 2007.

Bibliography 
Rik Reinking, Eva Martens, Petra Nietzky, Hajo Schiff, Robin Hemmer, Thomas Schönberger, Anne Vieth, Sculpture@CityNord: Das temporäre Skulpturenprojekt 2006, Modo, Freiburg, 2007. 
Nir Alon, Anke Feuchtenberger, Stefano Ricci, Ich/I/Je/Io, Mami Verlag, Hamburg, 2008.
Michele Robecchi, The Ground on Which I Stand: Nir Alon & Gazmend Ejupi, STP Books, London, 2019.

External links 
Official website: http://www.nir-alon.com/

References 

Living people
1964 births
20th-century Israeli sculptors
21st-century Israeli sculptors
Bezalel Academy of Arts and Design alumni
Israeli contemporary artists